Meri-Tuuli Elorinne (born September 10, 1985 in Helsinki), better known by her stage name Jippu, is a Finnish pop singer.

Her father Jorma Elorinne was an operatic tenor. She started singing very early and at age 11 was part of The Kids. She released her single "Kii" in 2005 that was used as a theme song for FC Venus, a Finnish romantic comedy film directed by Joona Tena. Based on this, she released her debut album Salaisuuksia, joita yksinäiset huutaa unissaan in September 2006. She won "Best debut album" for her release during Emma-gaala Finnish music awards in 2007. Her follow-up album Kuka teki minusta tän naisen went gold, reaching the top of the Finnish Albums Chart.

In 2008, she took part in the selection process to represent Finland in the Eurovision Song Contest 2008 with the song "Kanna minut", but was unsuccessful in her bid as the choice went for Teräsbetoni and their song "Missä miehet ratsastaa"

In late 2009 her collaboration with Samuli Edelmann resulted in a very successful joint album entitled Pimeä onni that reached #2 in the Finnish Albums Chart. Her duo single "Jos sä tahdot niin" with Edelmann topped the Finnish singles chart followed by another single with Edelmann, the title track "Pimeä onni" hit the top 20. She returned in 2012 with her solo album released in April 2012 entitled Väärinpäin lentävät linnut.

Discography

Albums

EPs 
2006: Enkelten kaupunki (Sunsilk, Special Edition, 2006)

Singles 
Charting singles

Other solo song releases
2004: "Piiloon/Liikaa/Kii" 
2005: "Kii" 
2006: "Kukkakaupan kulmalla" 
2006: "Enkelten kaupunki" (promotional single)
2006: "Kaksi kauneinta" (promotional single)
2006: "Piiloon" (promotional single)
2007: "Vanha kaunis mies" (promotional single)
2008: "Kanna minut" (promotional single)
2008: "Kuka teki minusta tän naisen" (promotional single)
2008: "Tuonelan koivut" (promotional single)
2012: "Väärinpäin lentävät linnut"

Music videos 
 Kii
 Enkelten kaupunki (directed by Lauri Nurkse)
 Kuka teki minusta tän naisen (directed by Lauri Nurkse)
 Tuonelan koivut (directed by Tuukka Temonen)

References

CMT.com Jippu page

External links
Discogs

1985 births
Living people
Singers from Helsinki
Finnish pop singers
21st-century Finnish women singers